Oncopsis is a genus of leafhoppers belonging to the family Cicadellidae subfamily Eurymelinae. In this genus the striations on the pronotum are parallel to the hind margin.

Species

 Oncopsis abietis
 Oncopsis albicollis
 Oncopsis alni
 Oncopsis aomians
 Oncopsis appendiculata
 Oncopsis arizona
 Oncopsis aurantiaca
 Oncopsis aureostria
 Oncopsis avellanae
 Oncopsis baileyi
 Oncopsis californicus
 Oncopsis caliginosa
 Oncopsis carpini
 Oncopsis cinctifrons
 Oncopsis citra
 Oncopsis citrella
 Oncopsis cognata
 Oncopsis coloradensis
 Oncopsis concurrens
 Oncopsis crispae
 Oncopsis deluda
 Oncopsis dentata
 Oncopsis despectus
 Oncopsis discrepans
 Oncopsis dorsalis
 Oncopsis enopsis
 Oncopsis fitchi
 Oncopsis flavicollis
 Oncopsis flavovirens
 Oncopsis fumosa
 Oncopsis furvus
 Oncopsis fuscus
 Oncopsis incidens
 Oncopsis infumata
 Oncopsis insignifica
 Oncopsis interior
 Oncopsis ivanovae
 Oncopsis juglans
 Oncopsis juno
 Oncopsis kogotensis
 Oncopsis kuluensis
 Oncopsis lata
 Oncopsis mali
 Oncopsis marilynae
 Oncopsis melichari
 Oncopsis mica
 Oncopsis minor
 Oncopsis monticola
 Oncopsis nepalensis
 Oncopsis nigrinasi
 Oncopsis nigritus
 Oncopsis nitobei
 Oncopsis obstructa
 Oncopsis ochotensis
 Oncopsis omogonis
 Oncopsis plagiata
 Oncopsis planiscuta
 Oncopsis prolixa
 Oncopsis punctatissima
 Oncopsis quebecensis
 Oncopsis sardescens
 Oncopsis sepulcralis
 Oncopsis sobrius
 Oncopsis speciosa
 Oncopsis subangulata
 Oncopsis subangulatus
 Oncopsis sulphurea
 Oncopsis tadzhicus
 Oncopsis tangenta
 Oncopsis tenuifoliae
 Oncopsis testacea
 Oncopsis tortosa
 Oncopsis towadensis
 Oncopsis trimaculata
 Oncopsis tristis
 Oncopsis truncatus
 Oncopsis wagneri
 Oncopsis variabilis
 Oncopsis vartyi

References 

Eurymelinae
Cicadellidae genera